Partizan Island is an island in Antarctica. Mapped by Norwegian cartographers from air photos taken by the Lars Christensen Expedition (1936–37). They gave the name Onguloy (Fishook Island), but that name might be confused with the better known Ongul Island, the site of recent Japanese Antarctic Research Expeditions. The area was subsequently photographed from the air by U.S. Navy Operation Highjump (1946–47), ANARE (Australian National Antarctic Research Expeditions) (1954–58), and the Soviet Antarctic Expedition (1956). It was renamed Ostrov Partizan (Partisan Island) by the Soviet expedition.

See also 
 List of antarctic and sub-antarctic islands

Islands of Princess Elizabeth Land